Max Constant Armand Van Dyck (23 December 1902 – 26 December 1992) was a Belgian painter. He was the husband of Éliane de Meuse. They attended together the courses of the same professors at the Académie Royale des Beaux-Arts, Brussels.

1902 births
1992 deaths
Prix de Rome (Belgium) winners
Artists from Brussels
20th-century Belgian painters